Batuhan Altıntaş (born 28 April 1996) is a Turkish sprinter specialising in the 400 metres. Individually, he won the bronze medal at the 2015 European Junior Championships. In addition, he won two relay medals at the Islamic Solidarity Games.

International competitions

Personal bests
Outdoor
200 metres – 21.05 (+0.7 m/s, Tunis 2016)
300 metres – 32.76 (Ankara 2016)
400 metres – 46.37 (Lille 2017)

Indoor
200 metres – 21.33 (Istanbul 2016) 	
400 metres – 46.55 (Vienna 2016)

References

1996 births
Living people
Turkish male sprinters
Place of birth missing (living people)
Competitors at the 2017 Summer Universiade
Competitors at the 2019 Summer Universiade
Athletes (track and field) at the 2018 Mediterranean Games
Mediterranean Games competitors for Turkey
Islamic Solidarity Games competitors for Turkey
European Games competitors for Turkey
Athletes (track and field) at the 2019 European Games
21st-century Turkish people